Lundacera is a genus of spiders in the family Ochyroceratidae. It was first described in 1951 by Machado. , it contains only one species, Lundacera tchikapensis, found in Angola.

References

Endemic fauna of Angola
Ochyroceratidae
Monotypic Araneomorphae genera
Spiders of Africa